Delvin Lionel Breaux (born October 25, 1989) is a former American professional gridiron football cornerback who played in the Canadian Football League (CFL) and National Football League (NFL). He attended McDonogh 35 High School in New Orleans, Louisiana. He was a member of the Louisiana Bayou Vipers, New Orleans VooDoo, BC Lions, Hamilton Tiger-Cats and New Orleans Saints.

Early years
Breaux fractured his C4, C5 and C6 vertebrae during a kickoff return in a high school football game on October 27, 2006. His doctor said it was "like a miracle" that he was neurologically fine. He had earlier received a scholarship to play football for the LSU Tigers. The Tigers honored his scholarship and he arrived at LSU in December 2008 but was never cleared to play. He was a player-coach for the Tigers. Breaux eventually stopped going to practice and later left LSU.

Professional career

Gridiron Developmental Football League

Louisiana Bayou Vipers
Breaux played for the Louisiana Bayou Vipers of the Gridiron Developmental Football League (GDFL) in 2012 and was named an All-Star.

Arena Football League

New Orleans VooDoo
Breaux was signed by the New Orleans VooDoo of the Arena Football League (AFL) on November 5, 2012. He was placed on Other League Exempt by the VooDoo on May 22, 2013. His AFL rights were assigned to the Tampa Bay Storm on October 16, 2015.

Canadian Football League

Hamilton Tiger-Cats
Breaux signed with the Hamilton Tiger-Cats on May 24, 2013.  He played for two seasons and was named to the CFL All-Star team in 2014.

National Football League

New Orleans Saints
Breaux was released by Hamilton so he could sign with the Saints. He signed with the New Orleans Saints on January 24, 2015.

In his first game with the Saints on September 13, he recovered a fumble against the Arizona Cardinals.
Breaux recorded his first career interception during the Saints' 39–17 loss to the Philadelphia Eagles. He was the Saints' recipient of the Ed Block Courage Award for the 2015 season. Breaux finished his first year in the NFL with 45 tackles and 3 interceptions. He was voted the team's defensive MVP by a fan vote on the Saints' website.

He suffered a broken fibula during the team's first game of the 2016 season on September 11. He missed the next six games then suffered a shoulder injury in Week 14. He was placed on injured reserve on December 23. 2016.

On August 16, 2017, Breaux suffered a fractured fibula yet again, to the same leg, and was ruled out for six weeks. He was initially diagnosed with a leg contusion by two orthopedic doctors on the Saints' medical staff, but later underwent an x-ray after making no substantial progress in the injury healing. The Saints subsequently fired two doctors over the misdiagnosis. He was placed on injured reserve on September 5, 2017.

Canadian Football League (second stint)

Second stint with Hamilton Tiger-Cats
On June 18, 2018, Breaux returned to the CFL when he signed a one-year deal with the Hamilton Tiger-Cats. Breaux's contract with Hamilton made him the highest paid defensive back in the Canadian league, making a little less than $200,000 before incentives.

Breaux announced his retirement from football on March 24, 2021. However, after sitting out the 2021 CFL season, Breaux was re-activated on January 17, 2022.

References

External links
Official website
Just Sports Stats
Hamilton Tiger-Cats bio

1989 births
Living people
African-American players of American football
African-American players of Canadian football
American football defensive backs
Canadian football defensive backs
Hamilton Tiger-Cats players
New Orleans Saints players
New Orleans VooDoo players
Players of American football from New Orleans
Players of Canadian football from New Orleans
Tampa Bay Storm players
21st-century African-American sportspeople
20th-century African-American people
Ed Block Courage Award recipients